The 2021 Mole Valley District Council election took place on 6 May 2021 to elect one-third of members to Mole Valley District Council in England. This Mole Valley local election had been postponed from 2020 because of the coronavirus pandemic, so it took place instead alongside the scheduled 2021 Surrey County Council election and all the other local elections across the United Kingdom. The 2021 election results are compared (in terms of percentage points gained or lost) against the results when these wards were last contested five years previously, in 2016.

Results summary

Ward results

Ashtead Common

Ashtead Park

Ashtead Village

Bookham North

Bookham South

Dorking North

Dorking South

Fetcham East

Fetcham West

Holmwoods

Leatherhead North

Leatherhead South

Westcott

References

Mole Valley
Mole Valley District Council elections
May 2021 events in the United Kingdom
2020s in Surrey